Wargamer (originally The Wargamer) is a British website specialising in tabletop games, with a particular focus on miniature wargames, tabletop role-playing games, and strategic card games. It also publishes articles on various digital wargames and strategy games for the PC and other digital platforms. It is currently owned and operated by Network N. It has several sister sites, including PCGamesN, Pocket Tactics, The Loadout, and The Digital Fix, which cover video games and home entertainment respectively.

History
The Wargamer was founded in September 1995 by Mario R. Kroll originally with the purpose of being a website to facilitate matchmaking play-by-email opponents for computer wargames. Its initial support included the Panzer General, Steel Panthers and the Close Combat series, although it quickly expanded to cover titles like Norm Koger's Age of Rifles, TalonSoft's Battleground series, and a number of HPS Simulations games. Eventually, The Wargamer evolved to provide editorial coverage, game reviews, news reporting and served as a custom scenario repository for nearly all war or strategy video games that supported custom scenario creation.

It suffered an outage for about ten days and data loss when hackers used a Microsoft FrontPage vulnerability for its defacement on 7–8 December 2012. As Kroll later said, the hacking incident was "the final straw" in his decision to sell the website after facing nearly two years of financial hardship. He contacted Matrix Games' owner David Heath, with whom he had cooperated in the past for making The Gamers Net (which The Wargamer was briefly part of), to arrange a deal with Shaun Wallace of MilitaryGamer, a website belonging to Heath. On 19 February 2003, Kroll announced that his site to be acquired by Virtual Business Designs, Inc. owning MilitaryGamer; it was merged with the latter in March.

The Wargamer was previously part of the Strategy Allies Network, together with Armchair General and HistoryNet,—the affiliation has since disbanded.

In 2010, Slitherine Software merged with the parent company of The Wargamer, Matrix Games.

In 2015, it was paired with mobile-strategy website Pocket Tactics when the latter was acquired by the Slitherine Group of companies. The definite article was dropped from its logo in February that year.

In 2017, it was joined by a third companion website when Strategy Gamer was launched in April. In February 2018, all three websites were sold to Network N. Ltd.

From 2018 to 2020, Joe Robinson was editor in chief of Wargamer (as well as of Pocket Tactics and Strategy Gamer).

Then, in January 2021, Network N relaunched Wargamer, with Alex Evans taking over as editor. The website launched with a new design, branding, and petrol-blue colour scheme, as well as a new editorial mandate to cover tabletop games of all kinds, alongside digital wargames.

Content 
Since its 2021 relaunch, Wargamer expanded focus has included significantly more coverage of miniature wargames, collectible card games, board games, tabletop role-playing games (including Dungeons & Dragons 5th edition), as well as Warhammer 40,000, Warhammer Age of Sigmar, and other Games Workshop tabletop miniature wargames.

Old Archives 
Since the change of ownership and web restructure of the Wargamer website in late January 2021 (Approximately Wednesday the 27th), the old review links that you may see on other sites pointing to the former Wargamer site's server may be auto changed to the new server's way of broadcasting their web addresses, despite showing error messages like "Page not found" and "This page has gone AWOL". An example below should show how to switch the incorrect automated web address of an old review link before January 27, 2021 to the correct format using Wayback Machine.

Last review from old pre-Jan 27, 2021 Wargamer server with correct address format (See the 'reviews' word divided before a game review text):
https://www.wargamer.com/reviews/combat-mission-black-sea/

However, the current site server will automatically switch the above link address to the incorrect address format, thus nothing will show up (See the 'review' word without the 's' suffix & that it's moved to after the division of the game review text):
https://www.wargamer.com/combat-mission-black-sea/review

Either the 's' letter can be added to the 'review' word at the end, then the combined 'reviews' word be moved to before the division before a legitimate game review text in the address link. Then the correctly formatted review link can be inputted into the Wayback Machine search bar and with an old archived date before Jan 27, 2021, the link to the correct review page content should successfully be found.

Another way is to start from a correct archived copy of the old 'https://www.wargamer.com/reviews' link in the Wayback Machine. Then manually search for an old review or article of interest. Although, some article links may not be archived and be lost forever.

Recognition
Wargamer has received recognition for excellence in content, including several mentions via PC Gamers military gaming column, authored by William R. Trotter. At its height of popularity, Wargamer enjoyed over a million monthly visitors and had incorporated Pie's Tactics, which at the time was the leading website for the tactical video game series Rainbow Six and Rogue Spear by Red Storm Entertainment. In spring 2001, it was ranked 66th out of the 100 most popular gaming websites by Hot100.com.

The site also achieved recognition outside its niche around 2002, when it was recommended by PC Magazine and the generalist gaming book The Rough Guide to Videogaming. The site's importance for the computer wargaming genre, usually deprived of reviews in the traditional wargaming media of the time, was academically recognised in the same year.

References

External links
 
 Wargamer - Public Relations (archived version)

English-language websites
Internet properties established in 1995
Video game news websites
Wargaming magazines